Palura is a taxonomic synonym that may refer to:

Palura  = Corgatha, a genus of moths
Palura  = Symplocos, a genus of plants